WJZZ is a radio station at 88.1 MHz in Montgomery, New York.

The station, organized as a 501(c)(3), went off the air in September 2018, due to lack of funding; the station briefly broadcast again on August 22, 2019, to keep its license.

History

Call sign
The call letters WJZZ originally belonged to an FM station in Bridgeport, Connecticut. It started in 1960 by John E. Metts, of Weston, Connecticut, the Vice President of a Bridgeport news station, WICC. Mr. Metts started the venture in partnership with Dave Brubeck as the program director. The Connecticut WJZZ began as an all-jazz station and was one of the pioneers of the "all-jazz" format. In 1964 it switched to broadcasting the "Top 60" classical performances, compiled in part by Leonard Bernstein. In early 1967, when it began broadcasting in FM stereo, it expanded its lineup to the "Top 100" classical performances while still retaining its original WJZZ call sign. WJZZ dropped the call letters to become WPSB on September 13, 1971; the station changed later to WEZN-FM.

In 1974, the WJZZ call letters landed on Detroit station WCHD-FM. WJZZ (105.9 FM) was a popular classic jazz/jazz fusion station in Detroit and became one of the first U.S. stations ever to use the smooth jazz format.  WJZZ was flipped to an urban contemporary format in August 1996, and its call sign changed back to WCHD, then later to WDMK. When Bell Broadcasting dropped the WJZZ call letters from the Detroit station, it parked them at stations it owned elsewhere in the state, first 1250 AM in Bridgeport, Michigan, then 1210 AM in Kingsley.

In June 2001, 107.5 FM in the Atlanta area changed format to smooth jazz and adopted the WJZZ call letters; it is now WAMJ. From 2009 to 2014, the calls were assigned to a radio station in North Salem, New York that is now WPUT.

Translators

References

External links 

JZZ (FM)
Jazz in New York (state)